Daddy Daughter Trip is a 2022 American comedy film directed by and starring Rob Schneider and written by Jamie Lissow and Patricia Maya Schneider. The rest of the cast consists of Mónica Huarte, Miguel Ángel Muñoz, Jackie Sandler, John Cleese, and introducing Miranda Schneider and Gavin Guerrero in their film debuts.

Plot

A man (Rob Schneider) takes his daughter (Miranda Schneider) on a Spring break road trip as they have various misadventures along the way.

Cast
 Rob Schneider as Larry Buble
 Mónica Huarte as Fernanda Arechavaleta
 Miguel Ángel Muñoz as Santiago Arachavaleta
 Jackie Sandler as Megan Buble
 John Cleese as Frank
 Miranda Schneider as Meara Buble
 Gavin Guerrero as Theo
 Patricia Maya Schneider as Jeanine
 Michael Bublé as himself
 Madeline Schneider as Madeline
 Elle King as Female Farmer

Production
The film was shot in Arizona. It was announced in July 2021 that filming wrapped.

Release
The film had its world premiere at Camelview at Fashion Square in Scottsdale, Arizona on September 27, 2022.

Reception
Bill Goodykoontz of The Arizona Republic awarded the film one and a half stars and wrote, "Too often the jokes don’t land. Neither does the physical comedy. The story doesn’t really hold. It’s clear that Schneider and his daughter love each other, and this film is a way to express that.  But it’s a lot to ask of the rest of us to watch it."

References

External links
 
 
 

2020s comedy films
2020s comedy road movies
2020s English-language films
2022 films
English-language comedy films
American comedy road movies
Films about father–daughter relationships
Films directed by Rob Schneider
Films shot in Arizona